The 2011 Football League Trophy Final was the 28th final of the domestic football cup competition for teams from Football Leagues One and Two, the Football League Trophy. The final was played at Wembley Stadium in London on 3 April 2011. The match was contested between Brentford and Carlisle United. Carlisle United won the match 1–0. Peter Murphy scored the winning goal, turning in a corner kick in the twelfth minute. It was the Cumbrians' second win in six attempts.

Match details

References

External links
Football League official report

Final
2011
Brentford F.C. matches
Carlisle United F.C. matches
2011 sports events in London
Events at Wembley Stadium